The Red Paintings were a collaborative art rock band originally formed in Geelong, Australia. The group was founded by Trash McSweeney, who provided lead vocals, guitar, sequencing and sampling. He was joined by various collaborators.

The band was known for their themed performances incorporating elements of theatre and art, often self-described as "orchestral sci-fi art rock". Band members often dressed in elaborate costumes and employed stage props, theatrical elements, and visual projections during their shows. The band often invited members of the audience to paint during live performances.

History

Formation and early releases 

McSweeney formed the project in Geelong, and described how he got the idea for the band, "I experienced a seizure at a friend's house... I saw things that really affected me, actual visuals in my head." McSweeney also claimed to have synaesthesia.

The group was briefly based in Melbourne before relocating to Brisbane. McSweeney was later joined by Leigh Doolan on drums, Jasmine Ebeling on bass guitar ,and Ellen Stancombe on violin, tin whistle, and vocals. This lineup released the EP Cinema Love on Asphalt Records.

The Red Paintings signed with the Brisbane-based label Modern Music, with distribution by Sony BMG, in early 2005. The title track from the Walls EP entered Triple J's Net 50 chart at no. 3 and charted for fifteen weeks. That year, they toured China and Hong Kong. Their next EP was Destroy the Robots, released in May 2006. It achieved some commercial success in Australia but with mixed reviews from music critics. The EP reached no. 86 on the ARIA singles chart.

In September 2006 the group supported an Australian tour by American band Dresden Dolls. Jade Pham of Rave Magazine described one of their shows: "art-rock weirdos the Red Paintings seem comparatively normal in this line-up; dressed in warped Geisha style while two painters either side of stage use people as canvas, and frontman [McSweeney] shoots the crowd with toy laser guns." The Red Paintings then supported Dresden Dolls again on an American tour. The tour was documented in the DVD Seizure & Synethesia, released in 2007. Also in 2007, the Red Paintings released the EP Feed the Wolf .

After several EPs, the Red Paintings announced plans for a full-length album and requested fan donations, raising A$40,000. The band moved to Los Angeles in 2012, and toured as the opening act on two tours by Mindless Self Indulgence. In 2013 they supported a tour by ...And You Will Know Us by the Trail of Dead The full-length album The Revolution Is Never Coming was released in 2013. The album received mixed reviews, with Gert Bruins of Background Magazine calling it "... much too ambitious. Some moments are difficult to stomach. It's only when they pull on the breaks sometimes, that the band's musicality becomes clear."

The Red Paintings relocated to the United Kingdom in 2014 and served as the support act on a tour by Gary Numan. In 2017 they released the single, "Deleted Romantic".

Members 
 Trash McSweeney – lead vocals, guitar, sequencing, sampling 
 Josh Engelking – percussion
 Wayne Jennings – cello
 Ellen Stancombe – violin
 Amanda Holmes – bass guitar
 Andy Davis – drums
 David Sue Yek – cello
 Leigh Doolan – drums

Discography

Albums 
The Virgin Mary Australian Tour Acoustic/Strings Album (2005)
Seizure & Synesthesia (video album, 2007)
The Revolution Is Never Coming (2013)

EPs
Walls (2005)
Destroy the Robots (2006)
Feed the Wolf (2007)

References

Musical groups from Brisbane
Victoria (Australia) musical groups
Australian rock music groups
The Red Paintings albums
Musical groups from Geelong